Al-Qaflah is a sub-district located in Qaflat Othor District, 'Amran Governorate, Yemen. Al-Qaflah had a population of 9122 according to the 2004 census.

References 

Sub-districts in Qaflat Othor District